Thabo Rakhale (born 20 March 1990) is a South African professional soccer player who last played as a winger for South African club Sekhukhune United.

Career 
Having left Chippa United in the beginning of July 2020 following the expiration of his contract, Rakhale signed for Tshakhuma Tsha Madzivhandila in November. In June 2021, ahead of the 2021–22 season, he moved to Sekhukhune United.

Style of play 
Rakhale is known for his skills and flair on the pitch. His showboating has received mixed reception, with some seeing it as "childish" or "disrespectful". In EA Sports' FIFA 17 and FIFA 18 video games, he was one of a select few players to have five-star skills.

References

External links
 

1990 births
Living people
People from Vanderbijlpark
Sportspeople from Gauteng
South African soccer players
Association football wingers
Sivutsa Stars F.C. players
Orlando Pirates F.C. players
Polokwane City F.C. players
Chippa United F.C. players
Tshakhuma Tsha Madzivhandila F.C. players
Sekhukhune United F.C. players
National First Division players
South African Premier Division players